David A. Brent is an American psychiatrist with expertise in child and adolescent psychiatry and suicidology. He is Professor of Psychiatry, Pediatrics & Epidemiology and Endowed Chair in Suicide Studies at the University of Pittsburgh School of Medicine, as well as the academic chief of Child and Adolescent Psychiatry at Western Psychiatric Institute and Clinic.

Education
Brent received his B.S. in General Science from Pennsylvania State University in 1972, his M.D. from Jefferson Medical College in 1974, and his M.S.Hyg. in epidemiology from the University of Pittsburgh in 1987. He trained in pediatrics at the University of Colorado and in general and child psychiatry at Western Psychiatric Institute and Clinic.

Career
Brent began working at Western Psychiatric Institute and Clinic in 1982 as a post-doctoral fellow. Since 1994 he has been a professor of child psychiatry and pediatrics there, as well as a professor of epidemiology at the University of Pittsburgh Graduate School of Public Health since 1995. He is also the co-founder and director of Services for Teens at Risk, a teen-oriented suicide prevention program funded by the Commonwealth of Pennsylvania.

Research
Brent's research focuses on the epidemiology of adolescent suicide and risk factors, including firearms, substance abuse, and affective disorders. His research has shown, for example, that 40 percent of children under the age of 16 who died by suicide did not have a clearly definable psychiatric disorder, but did have a loaded gun in their homes. Another of his studies found that adolescents who died by suicide were twice as likely to have lived in homes with guns than adolescents who unsuccessfully attempted suicide.

References

External links
David Brent at University of Pittsburgh School of Medicine

Living people
American child psychiatrists
University of Pittsburgh faculty
Pennsylvania State University alumni
Jefferson Medical College alumni
University of Pittsburgh alumni
Suicidologists
Physicians from Rochester, New York
Year of birth missing (living people)
Members of the National Academy of Medicine